Felisha Terrell (born March 16, 1979) is an American film and television actress.

Background
Terrell grew up in Chicago, Illinois. She was born to a European American mother and African American father. Terrell obtained her degree from the University of Iowa and entered pharmaceutical sales after graduation. In 2007, she relocated to Los Angeles to begin an acting career.

In 2009, Terrell had her first recurring role as Arianna Hernandez in the soap opera Days of Our Lives. She has had recurring roles on many television series, such as Marilyn Barnes on Ambitions, Detective Gwen Roberts on Tell Me a Story, Carlita on Shooter, Noelle Jasper on Just Add Magic, Isa Catalano on Survivor's Remorse, and Kali on Teen Wolf. Her notable non-recurring role was as "Alternate Michael" on Supernatural in 2018. She has also acted in films; for example, she played Lauren Paveza, a conscription officer, in The Tomorrow War.

Personal life
She is the former fiancée of the Cincinnati Bengals wide receiver Terrell Owens, and she made a guest appearance on his VH1 reality TV series, The T.O. Show.

Felisha is currently in a relationship with Donae Burston. They have a son together. Felisha announced her pregnancy through her private Instagram on the 18th of April, 2017.

Filmography

Film

Television

References

External links 
 

1979 births
Living people
21st-century American women
Actresses from Chicago
Actresses from Los Angeles
African-American actresses